Cystadenocarcinoma is a malignant form of a cystadenoma and is a cancer derived from glandular epithelium, in which cystic accumulations of retained secretions are formed. The neoplastic cells manifest varying degrees of anaplasia and invasiveness, and local extension and metastases occur. Cystadenocarcinomas develop frequently in the ovaries, where pseudomucinous and serous types are recognized. Similar tumor histology has also been reported in the pancreas, although it is a considerably rarer entity representing 1–1.5% of all Pancreatic cancer.

A cystadenocarcinoma contains complex multi-loculated cyst but with exuberant solid areas in places. It usually presents with omental metastases which cause fluid accumulation in the peritoneal cavity (ascites). Cystadenocarcinomas can be classified into serous  cystadenocarcinomas and mucinous cystadenomcarcinomas.

Serous cystadenocarcinomas 
Among the ovarian tumours, serous tumours are most common, having a variegated appearance. Bilateral presentation is common with serous cystadenocarcinoma.

See also 
 Papillary serous cystadenocarcinoma
 Ovarian serous cystadenoma

References

External links 

Gynaecological cancer
Pancreatic cancer